Portage Northern High School is a high school in Portage, Michigan.
Northern High School serves 1,420 students from ninth through twelfth grades. In addition to meeting the regular education needs of students living in the PNHS attendance area, the school also houses several special education programs that address the needs of students throughout the Portage district. In addition, Northern is one of nine Michigan high schools currently authorized to offer the International Baccalaureate Diploma Program, a rigorous curriculum for grades 11 and 12 that focuses on globalism and interdisciplinary study.

History
Portage Northern was built in 1965 to accommodate overcrowding at Portage Central High School, the school's crosstown rival. In 2007, Portage voters approved a bond issue that funded major renovations at Portage Northern as well as an entirely new Central High School. The renovations concluded in 2011.

Student activities

Arts
Portage Northern has an arts program with a band, choir, orchestra and visual arts program.

Athletics
Portage Northern High School has numerous Varsity and club teams, including: American football, soccer, baseball, softball, swimming, diving, marching band, tennis, golf, volleyball, basketball, wrestling, lacrosse, cross country running, track, competitive cheerleading, hockey, gymnastics, and water polo. Portage Northern competes in the west division of the Southwest Michigan Athletic Conference.

Notable alumni 

 Brandon Bye, member of the New England Revolution, part of Major League Soccer
Steve Carra, member of the Michigan House of Representatives
Andrew Evans, competed in the 2016 Summer Olympics in the discus throw event
 Timothy Granaderos, actor and model known for 13 Reasons Why
 Nick Keizer, NFL player for the Kansas City Chiefs
Scott Oudsema, professional tennis player
Leon Roberts, Major League Baseball player
Tommy Henry, Major League Baseball player

References

External links
Official site
Portage Public Schools

Public high schools in Michigan
Educational institutions established in 1965
Schools in Kalamazoo County, Michigan
1965 establishments in Michigan